Bryn Mawr-Skyway (pronounced  from Welsh for "big hill") is a census-designated place (CDP) in King County, Washington, United States. The population was 17,397 at the 2020 census.

Bryn Mawr-Skyway was the only CDP in the Seattle metropolitan area to have reported a majority-minority population in the 2000 census. Since that time, the area has grown even more diverse. As of the 2010 census, the demographic composition of the Skyway area is almost evenly distributed between White, Black or African American, and Asian community members.

Geography
Skyway lies in an "unincorporated island" bordered to the north by the city of Seattle, to the west by Tukwila, and to the south and east by Renton. Though it is surrounded by major municipalities, its limited infrastructure and low-income demographics have made it an unattractive area to incorporate. It is frequently along the shortest route of travel for commuters using local streets to enter Seattle from the southeast. The neighborhood was mostly developed just after World War II as affordable housing for returning veterans. The area remains an affordable area close to the high employment areas of Renton and Seattle. The name "Skyway" may be derived from the area's siting on a high ridge in western Washington's hilly terrain, a name that echoes the Welsh "Bryn Mawr" (also the name used for a village and several other places), which means "big hill".

Skyway's main business districts lie along Renton Avenue South, with one center between 68th Avenue South and 74th Avenue South, including a small casino, bowling alley, and a grocery outlet, and another district between 75th Avenue South and 78th Avenue South, including a bank branch, the fire station, multiple churches, a 7-11, some auto shops, and the public library (a branch of the King County Library System). There is also a small business district centered at Martin Luther King Way South (State Route 900) around South 129th Street. Skyway Park, with baseball fields, a creek and wetlands, and picnic areas, is located near the center of Skyway.

The Bryn Mawr-Skyway CDP is made up of many neighborhoods, including Lakeridge, Campbell Hill and Earlington, in addition to the neighborhoods of Skyway and Bryn Mawr. The community is sometimes called "West Hill".

Bryn Mawr-Skyway is located at  (47.494571, -122.236557).

Demographics

2010 Census
As of the census of 2010, there were 15,645 people, 5,772 households, and 3,742 families living in the greater Skyway area. The population density was 4,935.3 people per square mile (1,905.5/km2). There were 6,189 housing units at an average density of 1,952.4/sq mi (753.8/km2). The racial makeup of the area was 29.6% White, 31.4% Black or African American, 0.8% Native American, 27.1% Asian, 0.8% Pacific Islander, 2.9% from other races, and 7.2% from two or more races. Hispanic or Latino of any race were 7.7% of the population.

2000 Census
As of the census of 2000, there were 13,977 people, 5,574 households, and 3,578 families living in the greater Skyway area. The population density was 4,408.1 people per square mile (1,702.4/km2). There were 5,785 housing units at an average density of 1,824.5/sq mi (704.6/km2). The racial makeup of the area was 44.24% White, 25.33% African American, 0.81% Native American, 21.82% Asian, 0.51% Pacific Islander, 2.19% from other races, and 5.10% from two or more races. Hispanic or Latino of any race were 4.54% of the population.

There were 5,574 households recorded in 2000, out of which 28.2% had children under the age of 18 living with them, 45.6% were married couples living together, 13.7% had a female householder with no husband present, and 35.8% were non-families. 27.9% of all households were made up of individuals, and 9.3% had someone living alone who was 65 years of age or older. The average household size was 2.50 and the average family size was 3.08.

In the area, the age categories recorded in 2000 were 22.8% under the age of 18, 7.9% from 18 to 24, 31.0% from 25 to 44, 24.4% from 45 to 64, and 13.9% who were 65 years of age or older. The median age was 38 years. For every 100 females there were 97.6 males. For every 100 females age 18 and over, there were 95.3 males.

The median income for a household in the greater Skyway area in 2000 was $47,385, and the median income for a family was $55,927. Males had a median income of $38,821 versus $31,443 for females. The per capita income in Skyway was $23,294. About 6.4% of families and 7.7% of the population were below the poverty line, including 9.3% of those under age 18 and 6.4% of those age 65 or over.

Politics
Like most inner suburbs of Seattle, Bryn Mawr-Skyway is dominated by the Democratic Party in national elections. In 2004, Democrat John Kerry received over 70 percent of the vote, and Republican George W. Bush received just over 25 percent.

Neighborhoods
The Skyway/West Hill community is made up of nine neighborhoods:
 Black River
 Bryn Mawr
 Campbell Hill
 Earlington (also extends into the City of Renton)
 Hill Top
 Lakeridge (also extends into the City of Seattle's Rainier Beach neighborhood)
 Panorama View
 Skycrest
 Skyway (neighborhood)

Points of interest
 Bryn Mawr Park
 Lakeridge Park/Deadhorse Canyon

Education

School districts
 Renton School District
 Secondary Learning Center, now known as Albert Talley Sr. High School
 Dimmitt Middle School
 Bryn Mawr Elementary School
 Campbell Hill Elementary School
 Lakeridge Elementary School

References

External links
West Hill Community Council
West Hill Connects (discussion group)
Skyway Solutions

Census-designated places in King County, Washington